Aleksandrów  is a village in Biłgoraj County, Lublin Voivodeship, in eastern Poland. It is the seat of the gmina (administrative district) called Gmina Aleksandrów.

During World War II, Aleskandrow was in the midst of partisan activity against the local German garrison, and the ensuing Operation Sturmwind II that culminated in the Battle of Osuchy. Early on in either 1940 or 1944, half of the village was burnt to the ground before a high-ranking German officer came by to stop it.

The village has a population of 3,135.

References

Villages in Biłgoraj County
Lublin Governorate
Lublin Voivodeship (1919–1939)